I Was a Parish Priest or God's War (Spanish:La guerra de Dios) is a 1953 Spanish drama film directed by Rafael Gil and starring Claude Laydu, Francisco Rabal and José Marco Davó. It was awarded the Gran Premio at the first ever San Sebastián International Film Festival. It was also shown at the Venice Film Festival where it was awarded the Bronze Lion.

It portrays the efforts of a young Priest sent to a poor mining village in the early 1930s.

Synopsis 
A priest receives as his first assignment the parish of a mining town, beset by poverty. In this area he will focus all his forces to overcome the resentment accumulated by the miners towards the ecclesiastical profession.

Cast
   Claude Laydu as P. Andrés Mendoza  
 Francisco Rabal as Martín 
 José Marco Davó  as Don César 
 Fernando Sancho  as Barrona  
 Gérard Tichy as El Negro  
 Alberto Romea
 Carmen Rodríguez
 Ricardo Calvo 
 Julia Caba Alba  as Hermana de D. César  
 Félix Dafauce
 Milagros Leal 
 Mariano Azaña as Fermín, el cartero  
 José Sepúlveda 
Manuel Kayser 
 Arturo Marín 
 José Manuel Martín 
 José Miguel Rupert  
 Félix Briones 
 María Eugenia Escrivá as Margarita 
 Jaime Blanch as Daniel  
 Carlos Acevedo  as Niño  
 Juan José Vidal  as Niño

References

Bibliography 
 Bentley, Bernard. A Companion to Spanish Cinema. Boydell & Brewer 2008.

External links 
 

1953 drama films
Spanish drama films
1953 films
1950s Spanish-language films
Films directed by Rafael Gil
Films set in Spain
Films set in the 1930s
Cifesa films
Films about Catholicism
Films about Catholic priests
Spanish black-and-white films
1950s Spanish films